Mammillaria beneckei is a species of cacti in the tribe Cacteae. It is native to Mexico.

References

External links 
 Mammillaria beneckei at Tropicos

Plants described in 1844
beneckei